Nilambar Acharya is the former minister of Nepal and the present ambassador of Nepal to India. He had also been ambassador to Sri Lanka. He has completed Bachelor in Law from Tribhuvan University and master in Journalism from Moscow State University, Russia.

References

1943 births
Living people
Ambassadors of Nepal to India
Government ministers of Nepal
Ambassadors of Nepal to Sri Lanka
Tribhuvan University alumni
Moscow State University alumni